Hineni Youth and Welfare or Hineni is a Modern Orthodox, politically active, Zionist youth movement. It was founded in Sydney, Australia, and has centres in Sydney, Melbourne and Canberra.

In Sydney, Hineni is the official youth movement of the Central Synagogue. In Melbourne, Hineni is affiliated with and supported by Caulfield Hebrew Congregation, where weekly meetings take place. In Canberra, Hineni is based at the Canberra Jewish Community Centre.

Hineni runs weekly educational meetings for Jewish youth from years 3–12, as well as biannual camps, Israel year programs, seminars and other communal events. As an outreach movement, Hineni welcomes participants of all Jewish backgrounds.

Characteristics
Hineni provides informal Jewish education to complement that received in school and the home. It provides a relaxed environment, where chanichim (program participants) forge a Jewish identity as well as an Australian one.
The last senior summer camp, "Camp Technicolour", attracted more than 110 participants from across Australia and New Zealand.

History
Since its establishment as a synagogue youth group in 1974 it has developed into one of Australia's largest youth movements.
 The movement has grown out of Sydney, branching out into Canberra and Melbourne.
 The ideology has developed to its current form with three pillars of Modern Orthodoxy, politically active and pluralist Zionism.
 They have been accepted into the Australasian Zionist Youth Council (AZYC).
 There are weekly meetings and biannual camps.
 Groups of high-school graduates have been to Israel for the year-long 'Shnat' program.
Shlichim have been sent to the movement from Israel.

Shnat
Shnat is a year-long gap program run by Hineni for high-school leavers. For the duration of the program the members reside in Israel and experience Israeli life and culture, while fulfilling the role of a Zionist Jew. The 2012 Shnat program has 25 participants, which is the largest group Hineni has sent to Israel.

The program encompasses volunteering, experiential and educational components. A year in Israel with Hineni is a chance to connect to the Jewish homeland; to learn about Jewish history, culture and religion; to form friendships with other young people from Israel and around the world; and to learn Hebrew.

The Hineni Shnat Program begins with AZYC Opening Seminar and Hineni Opening Seminar. Hineni Shnatties participate in Machon, a four-month  program facilitated by the Education Department of the Jewish Agency for Israel. Machon is an educational institution where participants engage in leadership training, Jewish education and Zionist learning together with youth movement members from around the world. Hineni Shnat also includes a two-month Options Period where participants can choose from volunteering and educational options such as MDA ambulance service, the Marva army program, studying in Yeshiva/ Midrasha Jewish learning centres and more. Shnatties spend approximately six weeks living and working on a Kibbutz as well as participating in Hineni Jewish Learning Seminars and shabbatonim throughout the program.

Hineni Youth and Welfare Leaders 
2022 Hineni Leaders:

 Avital Prawer - Federal Rosh (President) 
 Gabrielle Saffer - Melbourne Rosh (President)
 Keila van der Plaat - Melbourne Sgan (Vice-President)
 Noah Loven - Melbourne Rosh Chinuch (Head of Education) 
 Leon Miller - Melbourne Gizbar (Treasurer) 
 Amira Susskind - Without Portfolio 
 Shaked Gozlan - Public Relations
 Ariella Hain - Limmudei Kodesh (Head of Jewish Studies)
 Benji van der Plaat - Junior Mentor

References

External links
Hineni Australia homepage

Judaism in Australia
Modern Orthodox Judaism
Orthodox Jewish outreach
Zionism in Australia
Zionist youth movements
Jewish youth organizations
Youth organisations based in Australia